Dnevnik HRT is the main news program of the Croatian public broadcasting company Hrvatska radiotelevizija (HRT), broadcast daily at 12:00, 19:00 and around 23:00

It broadcasts mainly on HRT1 and on HRT4, that has additional 
sign language added to the program.

Current presenters: (May 2021):

Dnevnik 1 (12:00):

Nikolina Ćosić
Igor Dunaj
 Vlatka Kalinić
 Andrej Rašljanin
 Nika Vincetić

Dnevnik 2 (19:00):

 Đurica Drobac
 Vlatka Kalinić
 Marta Šimić Mrzlečki

Dnevnik 3 (around 23:00):

 Goran Brozović
 Igor Dunaj
 Damir Smrtić
 Nika Vincetić

Current editors (May 2021):

Dnevnik 1: Goran Brozović, Ružica Renić Andrijanić, Anja Konosić, Mario Tomas

Dnevnik 2: Anja Šeparović Konosić, Darko Šokota

Dnevnik 3: Anita Bilić. Đurđica Plećaš, Mladen Sirovica, Mario Tomas

Sources

External links
Dnevnik on www.hrt.hr

Croatian television news shows
1968 Yugoslav television series debuts
1960s Yugoslav television series
1970s Yugoslav television series
1980s Yugoslav television series
1990s Croatian television series
2000s Croatian television series
2010s Croatian television series
Croatian Radiotelevision original programming